Raul Fernandez Arrizabalaga (born January 13, 1972, in Luarca) is a cyclist and judo athlete from Spain.  He is blind and is a B2 type athlete.  He competed at the 1996 Summer Paralympics in cycling. He competed at the 2004 Summer Paralympics in judo. He finished third in the Up to 90 kg Open group.

References 

Spanish male cyclists
Living people
1972 births
Paralympic bronze medalists for Spain
Cyclists at the 1996 Summer Paralympics
Judoka at the 2004 Summer Paralympics
People from Valdés, Asturias
Spanish male judoka
Paralympic medalists in judo
Medalists at the 2004 Summer Paralympics
Paralympic judoka of Spain
Paralympic cyclists of Spain
Cyclists from Asturias
20th-century Spanish people